Youth literacy rate is the percentage of literates in the age group 15–24. UNESCO updates this data every year. The table below contains the data published for the year 2015 by UNESCO .

* indicates "Literacy in COUNTRY or TERRITORY" or "Education in COUNTRY or TERRITORY" links.

References

Literacy
Countries
Literacy by country